Acalolepta loriai is a species of beetle in the family Cerambycidae. It was described by Stephan von Breuning in 1950, originally under the genus Cypriola. It is known from Papua New Guinea.

References

Acalolepta
Beetles described in 1950